The Indian narrow-headed softshell turtle (Chitra indica), also known as the small-headed softshell turtle or the Indo-Gangetic softshell turtle, is an endangered species of softshell turtle native to waterways and rivers of the Indian subcontinent. It is very large (being one of the largest freshwater turtles), feeding on fish, frogs, worms, crustaceans and molluscs, and even the occasional swimming small rodent or other mammal. C. indica, like other softshell turtles, uses it flexible (and somewhat leathery) shell to dig itself deep into sandy lake and river bottoms; here, it patiently waits (with just its nose, mouth and eyes exposed) for potential prey to swim by. They will also ambush and chase their prey, depending on availability, the time of year, and size of the prey. In the past it was included as a subspecies of Chitra chitra, a species restricted to Southeast Asia using current taxonomy.

Diagnostic characters

 Overall color: olive to deep olive-green;
 Very complex midline (vertebral) carapacial pattern;
 Midline (vertebral) carapacial stripe present;
 Complex radiating costal stripes;
 Paramedian neck stripes forming a bell-like pattern on anterior carapace absent;
 Neck stripes do not form a continuous light rim around carapace;
 No distinct pair of neck stripes;
 Dark speckling on "light" (head and neck) stripes;
 Anterior neck "V" divergence point on neck;
 3-4 forelimb lamellae;
 No peri-orbital X pattern;
 No distinct peri-orbital ocelli;
 No distinct naso-orbital triangular "figure";
 Few, if any, black dots present on chin pattern.

Type locality: "India, fl. Ganges, Penang"; restricted by Smith (1931:162) to "Fatehgarh, Ganges," India = "India: Ganges; Futtaghur" (Gray 1864: 92)

Distribution 

This species is found in the Sutlej and Indus river basins of Pakistan, and Ganges, Godavari, Mahanadi and other rivers basins of India, Nepal and Bangladesh. Although widespread, it occurs in low densities, even within protected areas. It is threatened by hunting and habitat loss. It prefers clear, large or medium rivers with sandy bottoms. It spends most of time concealed below the sand, sometimes with only the tip of the nose exposed.

Eating habits 

Buried in sand, the Indian narrow-headed softshell turtle waits for its prey to come into its reach. When this happens, the turtle's head extends out of its shell at a high velocity in order to grab and then eat the prey. In a 2009 video from Animal Planet's show River Monsters, this turtle is seen quickly extending its head and long retractable neck out of its shell.

Conservation 
The Nepali government has established a turtle breeding center in Chitwan National Park and granted permission to a non-governmental organization to rescue and conserve the turtles in eastern Nepal. Despite this, and the turtles' status as an endangered species, it is not on the Nepali government's list of highly protected wildlife. Conservationists have claimed the Nepali government's actions do not go far enough in protecting the turtles from natural and anthropogenic threats, such as increased flooding due to the worsening of monsoons caused by climate change, damming of rivers, and gravel mining.

In 2022, after two decades of breeding attempts, 41 newborn turtles hatched at San Diego Zoo.

Threats 
The turtles are often caught by humans, both as bycatch and for consumption, as turtle meat and eggs are considered a delicacy.

References

Bibliography 
  Database entry includes a brief justification of why this species is endangered and the criteria used
 Boulenger, G.A. 1889 Catalogue of the Chelonians, Rhynchocephalians, and Crocodiles in the British Museum (Natural History). British Museum, London, 311 pp.
 Engstrom, Tag N., H. Bradley Shaffer, and William P. McCord. 2002 Phylogenetic Diversity of Endangered and Critically Endangered Southeast Asian Softshell Turtles (TrionychidaChitra). Biological Conservation 104 (2):173-179
 Gray, J. E. 1831 A synopsis of the species of Class Reptilia. In: Griffith, E & E. Pidgeon: The animal kingdom arranged in conformity with its organisation by the Baron Cuvier with additional descriptions of all the species hither named, and of many before noticed [Vol. 9]. Whittaker, Treacher and Co., London: 481 + 110 pp.
 Gray, J. E. 1831 Synopsis Reptilium or short descriptions of the species of reptiles. Part I: Cataphracta, tortoises, crocodiles, and enaliosaurians. Treuttel, Wurz & Co., London, 85 pp.
 Gray, J.E. 1844 Catalogue of Tortoises, Crocodilians, and Amphisbaenians in the Collection of the British Museum. British Museum (Natural History), London. viii + 80 p.
 Gray, J. E. 1864 Revision of the species of Trionychidae found in Asia and Africa, with descriptions of some new species. Proc. Zool. Soc. London 1864: 76-98
 Webb, R.G. 1980 Gray, Hardwicke, Buchanan-Hamilton, and drawings of Indian softshell turtles (Family Trionychidae). Amphibia-Reptilia 1: 61–74.

External links
 

Chitra (genus)
Reptiles of Pakistan
Reptiles of India
Reptiles described in 1831
Taxa named by John Edward Gray